The women's 100 metres event at the 1991 Summer Universiade was held at the Don Valley Stadium in Sheffield on 20 and 21 July 1991.

Medalists

Results

Heats
Wind:Heat 1: +1.3 m/s, Heat 2: +2.6 m/s, Heat 3: +2.8 m/s, Heat 4: +2.0 m/s, Heat 5: +1.3 m/s

Quarterfinals
Wind:Heat 1: +2.8 m/s, Heat 2: +3.1 m/s, Heat 3: +4.3 m/s

Semifinals
Wind:Heat 1: +0.5 m/s, Heat 2: +1.6 m/s

Final

Wind: +1.6 m/s

References

Athletics at the 1991 Summer Universiade
1991